South African Class 12R 4-8-2 may refer to one of the following steam locomotive classes that were reclassified to Class 12R after being reboilered with Watson Standard no. 2 boilers:

 South African Class 12 4-8-2
 South African Class 12B 4-8-2